Professor Sue Bale, OBE, FRCN, RGN, NDN, RHV is a British nurse with a special interest in wound healing.

Education and career
She received her PhD degree from the University of Glamorgan (now the University of South Wales) in 2003.
 She currently works Director of Research & Development in Aneurin Bevan Health Board.

Work in wound healing
Bale was part of the original team that established a unique wound healing service in the Wound Healing Research Unit based at the University of Wales College of Medicine. She has written a range of books and articles on wound care.

She is a founder member of the Wound Care Society (1985); the European Wound Management Association; (1991); the Journal of Wound Care (1992); the European Pressure Ulcer Advisory Panel (1996).

Fellowship
Professor Bale is a fellow of the Royal College of Nursing.

Recent publications

References

Alumni of the University of Glamorgan
British non-fiction writers
Welsh nurses
Living people
People from Monmouthshire
Year of birth missing (living people)
Fellows of the Royal College of Nursing
British nurses